Pruthvikumar Macchi (born 21 January 1995) is an Indian-born cricketer who plays for the Oman cricket team. In September 2021, he was named in Oman's One Day International (ODI) squad for round six and round seven of the 2019–2023 ICC Cricket World Cup League 2. He made his ODI debut on 20 September 2021, for Oman against the United States.

References

External links
 

1995 births
Living people
People from Valsad district
Cricketers from Gujarat
Omani cricketers
Oman One Day International cricketers
Indian emigrants to Oman
Indian expatriates in Oman